Jackie van Beek (born 10 May 1976) is a New Zealand film and television director, writer and actress.

Early life 
Van Beek was born and raised in Wellington and attended Onslow College. She studied contemporary dance at the Wellington Performing Arts Centre, then completed a linguistics degree at Victoria University of Wellington, graduating in 1998. Throughout her studies she wrote and produced plays in Wellington theatres and schools.

Career
In 1999 van Beek moved to Auckland and worked on theatre productions, and she spent a year at Ohio Northern University as the writer-in-residence. In 2006 van Beek moved to Australia and began making short films. Her first feature film was The Inland Road, which was screened at the Berlin International Film Festival and the Seattle International Film Festival, followed by her second feature film, The Breaker Upperers.

Van Beek has won a number of filmmaking awards, including SPADA New Filmmaker of the Year in 2013, as well as acting awards. In 2014 she won Best Supporting Actress at the New Zealand Film Awards for her performance in What We Do in the Shadows.

She is co-creator, with Jesse Griffin and Jonny Brugh, of the award-winning 2019 TV sitcom about teachers in a secondary school, called Educators. She also stars in the show.

Personal life 
Van Beek is married to comedian Jesse Griffin. They got engaged a month after they met in 2006. They have three children.

Filmography

Plays

Films

Television

References

External links

1976 births
Living people
People educated at Onslow College
People from Wellington City
Victoria University of Wellington alumni
New Zealand film directors
21st-century New Zealand dramatists and playwrights
21st-century New Zealand actresses
New Zealand film actresses
New Zealand stage actresses
21st-century New Zealand women writers
New Zealand women dramatists and playwrights